This is a list of American television-related events in 1970.

Events

Television programs

Debuts

Ending this year

Networks and services

Network launches

Network closures

Television stations

Sign-ons

Network affiliation changes

Station closures

Births

Deaths

See also 
1970 in television 
1970 in film 
1970 in the United states 
List of American films of 1970

References

External links 
List of 1970 American television series at IMDb